Gunnar Vatnhamar (born 29 March 1995) is a Faroese professional footballer who plays as a midfielder for Víkingur Gøta in the Faroe Islands Premier League.

International career
Vatnhamar made his international debut for the Faroe Islands national football team in a friendly 1–1 tie with Latvia on 22 March 2018, coming on as a substitute in the 88th minute.

International goals
Scores and results list Faroe Islands' goal tally first.

Honours
Víkingur Gøta
 Faroe Islands Premier League: 2016, 2017
 Faroe Islands Cup: 2014, 2015
 Faroe Islands Super Cup: 2014, 2015, 2016, 2017, 2018

References

External links
 Soccerway Profile
 Faroe Soccer Profile

1995 births
Living people
Faroese footballers
Faroe Islands international footballers
Víkingur Gøta players
Faroe Islands Premier League players
Association football midfielders
Faroe Islands under-21 international footballers